The Statler Hotel company was one of the United States' early chains of hotels catering to traveling businessmen and tourists. It was founded by Ellsworth Milton (E. M.) Statler  in Buffalo, New York.

Early ventures 
In 1901, Buffalo hosted the Pan-American Exposition. Statler built a hotel on the Exposition grounds and called it "Statler's Hotel". It was a temporary wooden structure intended to last the duration of the Exposition. With 2,084 rooms, it could accommodate 5,000 guests. Although the Exposition was deemed an overall failure due to a number of factors (including bad weather and the assassination of President William McKinley), Statler was one of the few vendors to make a small profit.

His next venture was the Inside Inn, built for the 1904 Louisiana Purchase Exposition in St. Louis, Missouri.  Another temporary wooden structure, it was the world's largest hotel with 2,257 rooms. A grand success, the hotel made Statler a net profit of $361,000 and laid the groundwork for his first permanent hotel.  The hotel was then dismantled and sold for scrap. The Inside Inn was near the edge of Forest Park in St. Louis, now traversed by Highway 64/40.

Company history 
The first "permanent" Statler hotel was designed by August Esenwein and James A. Johnson, built in Buffalo, New York, and offered 300 rooms and bathrooms (later expanded to 450 rooms and baths). It was the first hotel chain to offer such amenity. The hotel was successful and led to a chain of hotels in other cities. Statler's intent was not to compete with the luxury hotels, but to provide, clean, comfortable, and moderately-priced rooms for the average traveler. Statler was the first major hotel chain to have a bathroom in every room. His innovative Statler Plumbing Shaft is still used in modern construction. From providing paper and pens for correspondence (prominently bearing the Statler name) to a light in the closet, Statler brought the average traveler a level of luxury that was otherwise unaffordable.

Rooms were originally available at what seemed a very cheap price, leading many other hoteliers to predict the failure of the Buffalo hotel. The opening night price was as low as $1.50 for a guest room, leading to the slogan "A Room and a Bath for a Dollar and a Half". The hotel had a $500,000 line of credit available, but maintained positive cash flow and Statler never used the line of credit. The Statler hotel in St. Louis was the first in the nation to offer air conditioning. The Dallas Statler hotel was the first in the nation to have elevator music.

Each of the subsequent Statler Hotels built upon this formula for success. Reflecting the era's enthusiasm for scientific management, Statler took pride in how he standardized questions of room design. His hotels had minimal wasted space, particularly on the guestroom floors, and he strove to have room layouts that would maximize efficiency and profitability.

After Statler's death in 1928, the company built hotels in Washington, D.C., Los Angeles, California, Hartford, Connecticut, and Dallas, Texas. Many of these hotels were designed by the architectural firm of George Post & Sons, the successor firm of George B. Post. In the mid- and late-1940s, pianist Liberace "gained national exposure through his performance contracts with the Statler and Radisson hotel chains".

The Hotels Statler Company, Inc., was sold to Conrad Hilton's Hilton Hotels in 1954 for $111 million, then the world's largest real estate transaction.

The Statler hotel in Buffalo was the first to be demolished after the Hilton acquisition, in 1968. The Statler hotel in New York became the Hotel Pennsylvania.

List of hotels

Gallery

The Statler Hotel - Buffalo, New York
The Travel Channel's documentary paranormal television show Destination Fear filmed at the location in 2019 for the seventh episode of their first season.

In 2020, former owner Mark Croce was killed in a helicopter crash. As of June 2021, the hotel has been purchased by developers planning to turn the building into a mixed-use structure with retail, meeting and entertainment space, and 600 - 700 residential units.

See also
List of tallest buildings in Buffalo

References

External links
Statler Hotel/Buffalo Hotel
E.M. Statler, Forgotten Detroit
Hotel Pennsylvania Official Website history page
Dallas Statler Hilton, The Nostalgic Glass
Statler's Restaurant
Statler's Pan Am Hotel
Buffalo Hotel Statler 1907
Statler's Buffalo estate
Buffalo Hotel Statler 1923
The Buffalo Statler Opens 1923

History of Buffalo, New York
Companies based in Buffalo, New York
1954 disestablishments in New York (state)
Buildings and structures in Buffalo, New York
Defunct hotel chains
American companies disestablished in 1954
1901 establishments in New York (state)
Defunct companies based in New York (state)